The 2015–16 Buffalo Sabres season was the 46th season for the National Hockey League franchise that was established on May 22, 1970. The season began its regular games on October 8, 2015 against the Ottawa Senators with a 3–1 loss.

This was originally to be the final season in which Rick Jeanneret serves as the team's play-by-play announcer; he has been in that position since the team's second season in 1971. As in recent years, he will rotate with Dan Dunleavy in the position. However, Jeanneret agreed to continue indefinitely as part-time announcer as long as his health allows it.

Off-season
The Sabres fired head coach Ted Nolan on April 12, 2015, amid poor on-ice record and disagreements with general manager Tim Murray. The team then made overtures to Mike Babcock, the most prominent head coach on the free agent market; despite a record-setting offer, Babcock instead sought (and received) the head coaching position for the Sabres' division and regional rivals, the Toronto Maple Leafs. With the Sabres failing to land Babcock, the team's second choice, Dan Bylsma, was subsequently hired on May 28. Bylsma had spent the 2014-15 season out of professional hockey after spending the previous five seasons with the Pittsburgh Penguins.

The Sabres held the second overall pick in the 2015 NHL Entry Draft after finishing last in the league in 2014-15 and losing the draft lottery to the Edmonton Oilers. The Sabres selected Jack Eichel with their pick.

The Sabres fired President Ted Black on July 27, 2015, and replaced him with Russ Brandon. Brandon also serves as President of the Buffalo Bills of the National Football League and will continue in that capacity in addition to his duties with the Sabres.

Training camp 
As in previous years, the Sabres held a summer development camp from July 6–11, 2015. The highlight of the camp was the "blue and gold" scrimmage on July 10; the scrimmage, which pit a "gold" team led by 2015 second overall pick Jack Eichel against a "blue" team led by 2014 second overall pick Sam Reinhart, drew 17,115 paying fans, nearly double the crowd that attended the 2014 event. An additional 1,500 fans attended the less-publicized 3-on-3 scrimmage, which closed out the camp on July 11.

The Sabres did not participate in the Detroit Red Wings' annual prospect tournament in Traverse City, Michigan as they have in recent years and instead launched their own "Prospect Challenge" beginning this season. For the first year, the Sabres, New Jersey Devils and Boston Bruins prospects faced each other in a single round-robin mini-tournament. Buffalo won both of their games and the tournament.

Standings

Schedule and results

Preseason

Regular season

Player stats 
Final stats

Skaters

Goaltenders

†Denotes player spent time with another team before joining the Sabres. Stats reflect time with the Sabres only.
‡Denotes player was traded mid-season. Stats reflect time with the Sabres only.
Bold/italics denotes franchise record.

Awards and honours

Awards

Milestones

Transactions
The Sabres have been involved in the following transactions during the 2015–16 season:

Trades

Notes
 Buffalo to retain 50% ($1.67 million) of salary as part of trade.
 Conditional 3rd-round pick will become 2nd-round pick in 2017 NHL Entry Draft if Ducks advance to 2016 Western Conference Finals and McGinn plays in 50% of playoff games in first two rounds.

Free agents acquired

Free agents lost

Claimed via waivers

Lost via waivers

Lost via retirement

Players released

Player signings

Draft picks

Below are the Buffalo Sabres' selections at the 2015 NHL Entry Draft, held on June 26–27, 2015 at the BB&T Center in Sunrise, Florida.

Draft notes
 The Buffalo Sabres' second-round pick went to the San Jose Sharks as the result of a trade on June 27, 2015 that sent a second-round pick in 2015 (39th overall), Colorado's second-round pick in 2016 and Colorado's sixth-round pick in 2017 to Colorado in exchange for this pick.
 Colorado previously acquired this pick from as the result of a trade on June 26, 2015 that sent Ryan O'Reilly and Jamie McGinn to Buffalo in exchange for Nikita Zadorov, Mikhail Grigorenko, J.T. Compher and this pick.
  The New York Islanders' second-round pick went to the Buffalo Sabres as the result of a trade on October 27, 2013 that sent Thomas Vanek to New York in exchange for Matt Moulson, a conditional first-round pick in 2014 and this pick.
 The Buffalo Sabres' third-round pick went to the Washington Capitals as the result of a trade on March 5, 2014 that sent Michal Neuvirth and Rostislav Klesla to Buffalo in exchange for Jaroslav Halak and this pick.

References

Buffalo Sabres seasons
Buffalo Sabres season, 2015-16
Buffalo Sabres
Buffalo Sabres